Dragón Fútbol Club is an Equatoguinean football club based in the city of Bata.

Honours

Domestic
Equatoguinean Premier League: 1
1983
Equatoguinean Cup: 1
2009

Performance in CAF competitions

Current squad

Bata, Equatorial Guinea
Football clubs in Equatorial Guinea